Front pointing is a technique used to ascend moderate to steep ice slopes in mountaineering and ice climbing. Also referred to as the German technique, it relies on kicking the "front-points" of specialized ice climbing crampons to embed them in the ice and allow vertical ascent.  While extremely secure in sound ice on steep grades, it is not appropriate on moderate grades, where the traditional technique of "flat-footing" (French technique) is used.

A typical technical ice-climbing crampon has 14 points.  Single-pointed "monospikes" are also made for front-pointing vertical ice.

All "front-point" crampons are rigid "step-in" style, with a locking cam-action lever on their heel to securely attach them to a technical mountaineering boot's lug.  In addition to being more secure, a rigid crampon is also easier on the calf muscles climbing steep ice.

References 

Climbing techniques
Ice climbing